Syrovatsky is a rural locality (a khutor) in Alexeyevsky District, Belgorod Oblast, Russia. The population was 15 as of 2010. There is 1 street.

Geography 
Syrovatsky is located 21 km southwest of Alexeyevka (the district's administrative centre) by road. Kamyshevatoye is the nearest rural locality.

References 

Rural localities in Alexeyevsky District, Belgorod Oblast
Biryuchensky Uyezd